CCFC may refer to:

Football clubs
In England:
 Cambridge City F.C., Cambridgeshire, England
 Chelmsford City F.C., Essex, England
 Chester City F.C., Cheshire, England
 Chichester City F.C., West Sussex, England
 Clapton Community F.C., London, England
 Coventry City F.C., West Midlands, England

In India:
 Calcutta Cricket and Football Club, Kolkata, India
 Chennai City F.C., Tamil Nadu, India

In Ireland:
 Chimney Corner F.C., County Antrim, Northern Ireland
 Cork Celtic F.C., Munster, Ireland
 Cork City F.C., Munster, Ireland

In Wales:
 Cardiff City F.C., Wales

Other uses
 Campaign for a Commercial-Free Childhood, an American healthcare coalition
 Campus Crusade for Christ, an interdenominational Christian organization
 Christian Children's Fund of Canada
 Compagnie du Chemin de Fer du Congo (Railway Company of the Congo)